Sara Vučelić (born 16 November 1986), better known as Soraja, is a Serbian-Montenegrian glamour model, media personality and socialite. She was a finalist on the fourth regular season of Serbian Big Brother in 2011, as well as on the fifth celebrity edition in 2013. Soraja was featured on the covers of CKM and Playboy in Serbia, Croatia, North Macedonia and South Africa.

Vučelić was born out-of-wedlock in Knin and was put in an orphanage in Bijela, Herceg Novi by her mother, because she was not able to raise Soraja on her own. After receiving a family inheritance at the age of nineteen, Soraja moved to Belgrade where she began modelling. In 2013, it was reported that Vučelić reconciled with her father, receiving inheritance of €400,000 and real estate in Zadar and Knin.

Soraja is also known for her extravagant lifestyle, legal issues and appearance modified by cosmetic surgery. She received international media attention for her alleged relationship with Neymar in 2014. As a citizen of Montenegro, Soraja was labelled as a threat to the national security in Serbia, thus was banned from entering the country in June 2018. She has also been connected with the Škaljari criminal organization.

Filmography

References

External links

1986 births
People from Knin
People from Herceg Novi
Serbs of Croatia
Living people
Reality television participants
Serbian television personalities
Serbian female models